George Charles Vassila (21 August 1857 – 27 November 1915) was an English cricketer.  Vassila was a right-handed batsman who bowled right-arm fast.  He was born at Kew, Surrey.

Vassila played a single first-class match for Middlesex in 1880 against Gloucestershire at the Clifton College Close Ground in Clifton, Bristol.

The season following his only first-class appearance, he stood as an umpire in a first-class match between Cambridge University and the Marylebone Cricket Club.  In 1889 he stood in his second and final first-class match between Cambridge University and Yorkshire.

Vassila died at Epsom, Surrey on 27 November 1915.  His death was registered as George Charles Vassilas.

References

External links
George Vassila at Cricinfo
George Vassila at CricketArchive

1857 births
1915 deaths
People from Kew, London
People from Surrey
English cricketers
Middlesex cricketers
English cricket umpires